Florence M. Sullivan (January 20, 1930 – June 21, 2020) was an American lawyer and politician from New York who served in the New York State Assembly from the 50th district from 1979 to 1983.

Life
She was born on January 20, 1930, in Brooklyn. She married, and raised three children in Bay Ridge, Brooklyn. Then she went back to school, earned a college degree, and taught high school. She graduated from St. John's University School of Law in 1974, was admitted to the bar in 1975, and worked as an Assistant D.A. of Kings County. She also entered politics as a Republican.

She was a member of the New York State Assembly from 1979 to 1982, sitting in the 183rd and 184th New York State Legislatures.

In 1982, she ran in the Republican primary for U.S. Senator from New York, and defeated Whitney North Seymour, Jr. and Muriel Siebert. Sullivan was also nominated on the Conservative and the Right to Life tickets to oppose the incumbent Democrat Daniel Patrick Moynihan at the United States Senate election in New York, 1982, but Moynihan scored a decisive victory over Sullivan, polling almost the double number of votes.

She was a partner in the New York City law firm of Connors & Sullivan.

Sullivan died in Brooklyn on June 21, 2020, aged 90.

References

|-

1930 births
2020 deaths
20th-century American women lawyers
20th-century American lawyers
Candidates in the 1982 United States elections
Lawyers from Brooklyn
Republican Party members of the New York State Assembly
Politicians from Brooklyn
St. John's University School of Law alumni
Women state legislators in New York (state)